The 2015 Limerick Senior Hurling Championship is the 121st staging of the Limerick Senior Hurling Championship since its establishment by the Limerick County Board in 1887. The championship began on 30 April 2015.

Kilmallock are the defending champions.

Fixtures/results

Group 1

Group 2

Quarter-finals

Semi-finals

Final

References

Limerick Senior Hurling Championship
Limerick Senior Hurling Championship